Elections to Penwith District Council were held on 3 May 2007.  One third of the council was up for election and the council stayed under no overall control.

After the election, the composition of the council was
Conservative 17
Liberal Democrat 12
Independent 5
Labour 1

Results

1 Conservative candidate was unopposed.

By ward

References

2007 Penwith election result
Ward results

2007 English local elections
2007
2000s in Cornwall